The 2018 Moneta Czech Open was a professional tennis tournament played on clay courts. It was the 25th edition of the tournament which was part of the 2018 ATP Challenger Tour. It took place in Prostějov, Czech Republic between 4–9 June 2018.

Singles main-draw entrants

Seeds

 1 Rankings are as of 28 May 2018.

Other entrants
The following players received wildcards into the singles main draw:
  Thomaz Bellucci
  Pablo Cuevas
  Filip Horanský
  Václav Šafránek

The following players received entry into the singles main draw as alternates:
  Benjamin Bonzi
  Vincent Millot

The following players received entry from the qualifying draw:
  Martín Cuevas
  Federico Gaio
  Gianluca Mager
  Jan Šátral

The following player received entry as a lucky loser:
  Marek Jaloviec

Champions

Singles

  Jaume Munar def.  Laslo Đere 6–1, 6–3.

Doubles

  Denys Molchanov /  Igor Zelenay def.  Martín Cuevas /  Pablo Cuevas 4–6, 6–3, [10–7].

External links
 Official website

2018 ATP Challenger Tour
2018
2018 in Czech tennis